The Great Central Railway Class 8H (LNER Class S1) was a class of 0-8-4T steam tank locomotives designed by John G. Robinson for hump shunting at Wath marshalling yard.

Overview 
Four locomotives were built in 1907/1908 for the Great Central Railway.  They were fitted with three cylinders.  This gave a more even torque than with a 2-cylinder locomotive and reduced the risk of wheelslip under heavy load.  All four passed into London and North Eastern Railway ownership at the 1923 grouping. At the time all four locomotives were allocated to Mexborough engine shed.

These were powerful locomotives but even more power was required so, in 1930, one locomotive was fitted with a superheater and a booster engine and classified S1/2.  Two new locomotives (with superheaters and boosters) were built by the LNER in 1932 and classified S1/3. The remaining (non-booster) locomotives were classified S1/1 and were also fitted with superheaters.   All the boosters were removed in 1943.

All six locomotives passed into British Railways ownership in 1948 and were numbered 69900-69905.

Dimensions 
 Locomotive weight:
 S1/1, 99 tons 6 cwt
 S1/2, 99 tons 2 cwt
 S1/3, 99 tons 1 cwt
 Superheater:
 S1/1, No, but fitted later
 S1/2, Yes
 S1/3, Yes
 Tractive effort, 
 Booster tractive effort, 
 Combined tractive effort, 

For terminology, see Steam locomotive components

References

External links 

 LNER Encyclopedia

08H
0-8-4T locomotives
Railway locomotives introduced in 1907
Scrapped locomotives
Standard gauge steam locomotives of Great Britain
Shunting locomotives